Robert Younger may refer to:

Bob Younger (1853–1889), American outlaw and member of the James-Younger gang
Robert Younger, Baron Blanesburgh (1861–1946), Scottish law lord
Rob Younger, Australian rock musician